PRC (Palm Resource Code) is a container format for code databases in Palm OS, Garnet OS and Access Linux Platform. Its structure is similar to PDB databases. Usually, a PRC file is a flat representation of a Palm OS application that is stored as forked database on the PDA.

PRC files are also used by the Mobipocket e-book-reader (here sometimes referred to as MOBI format). The AZW format of Amazon's Kindle reading device is in turn a DRM-restricted form of the Mobipocket format.

On Palm OS, PRC files are used for applications, localized resources (overlays) and shared libraries.

Structure of PRC file 
In its essence, a PRC file is similar to a classic Mac OS application. It contains a PRC header, PRC resource headers and PRC resources.

PRC Header 
The PRC header is located at the beginning of the file and contains meta-information on the file:

PRC Resource Header 
For every resource (specified by num_records), there is a resource header containing:

PRC Resources 
Every application contains al least a Code #0 resource with size information and jump tables, a Code #1 resource with executable code and data resources containing pre-initialized values of global variables in compressed form. Other resources that may be contained are forms, form objects, alerts and multimedia data, e. g. images and sounds.

References 

Computer file formats
Palm OS